Litoporus yucumo is a cellar spider species found in Bolivia.

See also 
List of Pholcidae species

Spiders of South America
Pholcidae
Spiders described in 2000